The Chiayi County Government (CYHG) is the local government of the Republic of China that governs Chiayi County.

History
The country government was formed in October 1950 by the Taiwan Provincial Government.

Organization
 Accounting and Statistics Department
 Civil Affairs Department
 Personnel Department
 Planning Department
 Economic Development Department
 Construction Department
 Agriculture Department
 News Marketing Department
 Water Resources Department
 Land Administration Department
 General Affairs Department
 Educational Department
 Civil Service Ethics Department

Transportation
The government building is accessible west from Chiayi Station of Taiwan High Speed Rail.

See also
 Chiayi County Council

References

1950 establishments in Taiwan
Chiayi County
Government agencies established in 1950
Local governments of the Republic of China